Ester Graff (3 May 1897 – 23 January 1991) was a Danish businesswoman and feminist. She worked for what later became Unilever from 1922, and after World War II became CEO of the Danish branch of the marketing bureau Lintas. From 1952 to 1958, she served as the 4th President of the International Alliance of Women.

References

1897 births
1991 deaths
Danish feminists
International Alliance of Women people